Clooney is a civil parish in County Clare, Ireland. It comprises the hamlets of Clooney (north and south), to the east of Ennistymon.

Geography
It is part of the historical barony of Corcomroe that is situated in the north-western part of the county. It is bordered by the parish of Kilfenora to the north, Kiltoraght to the north-east, Rath to the east, Inagh to the south, Kilfarboy to the southwest, and Kilmanaheen to the west. It is divided into 40 townlands:
  

Ardmore 
Ardrush 
Ballyculleeny
Ballyvranneen
Cahersherkin 
Carrownaclogh
Clooney (North)
Clooney (South) 
Cullenagh
Derrymore
Feagreen 
Garraun
Glen (North)
Glen (South) 
Gorteenmacnamara
Gortkeel 
Illaunbaun 
Keelkyle
Killeinagh 
Knockacarn
Knockacullea (North)
Knockacullea (South)
Knockanulty 
Knockatullaghaun
Knockdrummagh (North) 
Knockdrummagh (South) 	
Knocknagraigue (East)
Knocknagraigue (West) 
Knockneppy 
Knockroe
Lavarreen 
Lisroe
Moananagh
Mooghna
Renalicka 
Russa
Spaug 
Teerleheen
Tullagroe
Tullaloughaun

See also
List of townlands of County Clare

References

Civil parishes of County Clare